Bar Rud (also Romanized as Bar Rūd) is a village in Ahmadi Rural District, Ahmadi District, Hajjiabad County, Hormozgan Province, Iran. At the 2006 census, its population was 154, in 35 families.

References 

Populated places in Hajjiabad County